In automata theory, a nested stack automaton is a finite automaton that can make use of a stack containing data which can be additional stacks.  
Like a stack automaton, a nested stack automaton may step up or down in the stack, and read the current symbol; in addition, it may at any place create a new stack, operate on that one, eventually destroy it, and continue operating on the old stack. This way, stacks can be nested recursively to an arbitrary depth; however, the automaton always operates on the innermost stack only.

A nested stack automaton is capable of recognizing an indexed language, and in fact the class of indexed languages is exactly the class of languages accepted by one-way nondeterministic nested stack automata.

Nested stack automata should not be confused with embedded pushdown automata, which have less computational power.

Formal definition

Automaton
A (nondeterministic two-way) nested stack automaton is a tuple  where
 Q, Σ, and Γ is a nonempty finite set of states, input symbols, and stack symbols, respectively,
 [, ], and ] are distinct special symbols not contained in Σ ∪ Γ,
 [ is used as left endmarker for both the input string and a (sub)stack string,
 ] is used as right endmarker for these strings,
 ] is used as the final endmarker of the string denoting the whole stack.
 An extended input alphabet is defined by Σ' = Σ ∪ {[,]}, an extended stack alphabet by Γ' = Γ ∪ {]}, and the set of input move directions by D = {-1,0,+1}.
 δ, the finite control, is a mapping from Q × Σ' × (Γ' ∪ [Γ' ∪ {], []}) into finite subsets of Q × D × ([Γ* ∪ D), such that δ maps

Informally, the top symbol of a (sub)stack together with its preceding left endmarker "[" is viewed as a single symbol; then δ reads 
 the current state, 
 the current input symbol, and 
 the current stack symbol, 
 and outputs 
 the next state, 
 the direction in which to move on the input, and
 the direction in which to move on the stack, or the string of symbols to replace the topmost stack symbol.
 q0 ∈ Q is the initial state,
 Z0 ∈ Γ is the initial stack symbol,
 F ⊆ Q is the set of final states.

Configuration
A configuration, or instantaneous description of such an automaton consists in a triple 
,
where
 q ∈ Q is the current state,
 [a1a2...ai...an-1] is the input string; for convenience, a0 = [ and an = ] is defined The current position in the input, viz. i with 0 ≤ i ≤ n, is marked by underlining the respective symbol.
 [Z1X2...Xj...Xm-1] is the stack, including substacks; for convenience, X1 = [Z1  and Xm = ] is defined. The current position in the stack, viz. j with 1 ≤ j ≤ m, is marked by underlining the respective symbol.

Example
An example run (input string not shown):

Properties
When automata are allowed to re-read their input ("two-way automata"), nested stacks do not result in additional language recognition capabilities, compared to plain stacks.

Gilman and Shapiro used nested stack automata to solve the word problem in certain groups.

Notes

References

Models of computation
Automata (computation)